Rangel is a Spanish and Portuguese surname.

Rangel may also refer to the following places:

Rangel, Luanda, Angola
Rangel Municipality, Mérida, Venezuela)

See also

Wrangle (disambiguation)
Wrangel (disambiguation)
Irma Lerma Rangel Young Women's Leadership School in Dallas, Texas, U.S.
Rangle, small stones fed to hawks to aid digestion